Robert Richardson (1 February 1862 – 28 December 1943) was a Labour Party politician in the United Kingdom.

Richardson was educated at Ryhope National School before becoming a coal miner in 1871, serving as a checkweighman from 1900.  His entry in the Times House of Commons 1919 noted that he had 'worked at all kind of jobs in the pit'.  He became active in the Durham Miners' Association, serving on its executive from 1897.

Richardson was elected to Durham County Council in 1901, the Ryhope Board of Guardians in 1904, and also Sunderland Rural District Council in 1904, chairing this from 1910 to 1913.  He was elected at the 1918 general election as Member of Parliament for Houghton-le-Spring in County Durham, defeating the sitting Liberal MP Thomas Edward Wing by 689 votes in a close three-way contest.  Richardson held the seat until the 1931 general election, when Labour split over budgetary policy and its leader Ramsay MacDonald left the party to form a National Government.  His Conservative Party successor Robert Chapman served only one term in Parliament, as Labour regained the seat at the 1935 general election; but Richardson did not stand again after his defeat.

References

External links 
 

1862 births
1943 deaths
Labour Party (UK) MPs for English constituencies
Miners' Federation of Great Britain-sponsored MPs
UK MPs 1918–1922
UK MPs 1922–1923
UK MPs 1923–1924
UK MPs 1924–1929
UK MPs 1929–1931